The Palmdale Aerospace Academy (TPAA) is located in Palmdale, California. The charter school opened to 540 students from grades seventh through ninth on September 5, 2012 and is now open for grades K-12.

Partnerships 
TPAA has partnered with aerospace industry employers, the City of Palmdale, the Palmdale School District and others for science, technology, engineering, and mathematics (STEM) education that involves collaborative learning for college preparation.

Clubs list (partial)  
 Science Olympiad
 Soccer
 Key Club
 Game Engineers 
 AERO Club (formerly known as Civil Air Patrol ACE Club)
 Astronomy Club
 Gardening Club
 GryffinGear 5012 
 Venture Crew 180
 CSF
 Gardening Club
 Christian Club
 Co-Ed Volleyball Club
 Drama Club
 Comic Book Club

References

External links 

Antelope Valley
2012 establishments in California
Education in Palmdale, California
Educational institutions established in 2012
Educational institutions in the United States
Palmdale, California